The Subantarctic rayadito (Aphrastura subantarctica) is a species of bird in the family Furnariidae that is endemic to the Diego Ramírez Islands, an archipelago located in the southernmost extreme of Chile.

Taxonomy
Subantarctic rayadito individuals were formerly identified as belonging to the species Aphrastura spinicauda (thorn-tailed rayadito). However, the newly identified A. subantarctica has a larger body mass and shorter tails. In 2022, A. subantarctica was split off as a separate species from A. spinicauda by Ricardo Rozzi et al. (2022), on the basis of genetic, morphological, and behavioral evidence.

The name of the new passerine species Aphrastura subantarctica  was made available in the publication “El Rayadito subantártico: disponibilidad del binomio Aphrastura subantarctica (Passeriformes, Furnariidae)” This nomenclatural act has been registered with ZooBank. The LSID for this publication is: urn:lsid:zoobank.org:pub:1EF6362A-A30E-4EA5-8421-950F211EE5D0.

Habitat
While Aphrastura spinicauda lives in forested habitats, A. subantarctica lives in the non-forested habitats of the Diego Ramírez Islands.

Notes

References

Subantarctic rayadito
Birds of Chile
Diego Ramírez Islands
Subantarctic rayadito